The 2000 UCLA Bruins football team represented the University of California, Los Angeles in the 2000 NCAA Division I-A football season.  They played their home games at the Rose Bowl in Pasadena, California and were led by head coach Bob Toledo.

Schedule

Roster

Game summaries

Alabama

    
    
    
    
    
    
    
    
    

DeShaun Foster 42 Att, 187 Yds

Rankings

References

UCLA
UCLA Bruins football seasons
UCLA Bruins football